Richie Rich's Christmas Wish (also known as Richie Rich 2) is a 1998 direct-to-video American film based on the Harvey Comics cartoon character Richie Rich. It is a stand-alone sequel to the 1994 film Richie Rich, starring David Gallagher as the title character. Its plot is similar to the 1946 film It's a Wonderful Life, placing Richie Rich in the role of George Bailey and Reggie Van Dough in the role of Mr. Potter.

Plot

In Christmas Eve, Richie Rich, the world's richest kid, was excited to spend the day with his friends. While racing wildly with his friends in the snow, Richie's butler, Herbert Cadbury, controls the cars using a remote and guides the children back to Richie's house. He then reminds him about his responsibilities that are due to be executed on Christmas Eve, and instructs him to change his clothes and get ready for tea. Before going to do so, he visits his home scientist, Professor Keanbean, who shows him his recent invention, a wishing machine which works only on Christmas Eve. The day being that, Richie wishes for a "big pie" from it, and is given a "pig sty" instead. Cadbury is disgusted seeing this, and sends him off to change his clothes. He meets his parents, Richard and Regina Rich, to ask what they would like to have for Christmas. While with them, he also tries out his father's new fishing rod invented by Keanbean, which hooks on to a tuna sandwich in the vicinity. He then goes on to change his clothes.

During tea, Richie meets his spoiled cousin, Reggie Van Dough, who wishes that he was as rich as Richie. Later, he dresses up like an elf with Cadbury as Santa Claus to distribute Christmas presents to the orphanage. While getting ready, Cadbury tells Richie about how he was a rock star in his youth days, in a band called Root Canal. When they take off in the sleigh with Richie driving it, Reggie takes control of it using the remote invented by Keanbean that Cadbury used earlier. He guides it through streets by shops, houses, and people, thus nearly destroying everything in the whole process. Richie and Cadbury end up in an accident in which the sleigh falls and literally explodes along with the presents, while Cadbury hurts his ankle badly. Richie runs off to fetch help, but once he enters the city, he sees that the situation has changed dramatically. Reggie is cooking up rumors about him, and all the people have turned against him.

Devastated and believing the whole incident was his fault, Richie goes into Keanbean's laboratory and squats in front of the wishing machine. While fretting over his ill luck, he accidentally wishes that he was never born. The machine at once grants his wish, following which he is transported to another world in which he was never born and hence nobody recognizes him. Reggie has taken over as Richard and Regina's son, and is now the richest kid in the world. He bosses around everyone. Roads and buildings are named after him. Reggie controls the entire town and including the police force. This world is very sad, and hunger and misery are seen all over. This makes Richie realize that things would not be better if he was not born, and hence decides to go back to the world in which he is Richie Rich.

Though his parents do not recognize him anymore, he is happy that his dog, Dollar, does. He takes Dollar with him, only to enrage Reggie, who is his current owner. Reggie orders policemen to search for Richie, who is falsely called the "dognapper", and also announces a reward for catching him. After outsmarting various policemen who try but fail to catch him, Richie finds Cadbury, who is still part of Root Canal, and Keanbean, who runs his own laboratory called "Keanbean's World of Wonders". Richie questions Keanbean about the wishing machine, which he says, requires a Pegliasaurus wishing bone in order to be complete. Along with his friends who decide to help him, Richie goes to the city museum to retrieve the bone from the dinosaur skeleton. After passing through laser detection systems successfully, they get it, using the fishing rod invented by Keanbean. Before they get out of the museum, Richie and his friends spot Reggie's parents, who are now working as night guards there.

Once they reach the lab, they get the machine to work properly. However, before Richie could wish himself back, Reggie arrives there with the policemen. Richie, Cadbury, Keanbean, and Richie's friends are put in jail, while Reggie takes the machine home. At home, Reggie wishes for the ability to fly, but before he can make another wish, Dollar runs off with the wishbone. When it does not work the second time, he leaves the room in a huff, and retires. In jail, Richie and his friends are bailed out by Root Canal. They all rush to Reggie's house, and while he is still sleeping, Richie tries to wish himself back. However, they find that the machine is no longer working, as Reggie had kicked it in anger earlier. While Keanbean is fixing it, Reggie wakes up and comes flying in, only to be attacked by Richie and his friends. They defeat him and everyone quits working for him, with Sgt. Mooney refusing to work for someone who would cancel Christmas. After that, the machine starts working again, and Richie wishes himself back as Richie Rich.

Richie sets right all the things that had gone wrong since his vanishing act, and is now much more grateful to be alive. As everyone is glad to have him back, they gather around the Christmas tree and sing.

Extended TV ending
Reggie is caught red-handed by his parents with his actions against Richie, and Reggie's parents make him apologize for all the trouble he caused to Richie, admitting that he was the one who took control of the sleigh and ruined the event. Richie realizes that it wasn't his fault, he should have known it was Reggie, and he made that wish for nothing. They forgive each other.

Cast
 David Gallagher – Richie Rich
 Martin Mull – Richard Rich
 Lesley Ann Warren – Regina Rich
 Jake Richardson – Reggie Van Dough
 Eugene Levy – Professor Keanbean
 Keene Curtis – Herbert Cadbury
 Richard Riehle – Sgt. Kenneth Carl Mooney
 Don McLeod – Irona
 Michelle Trachtenberg – Gloria Glad
 Richard Fancy – Mr. Van Dough
 Marla Maples – Mrs. Van Dough
 Blake Jeremy Collins – Freckles
 Austin Stout – Pee Wee
 Kathleen Freeman - Mrs. Lisa Peabody
 Don McLeod - Irona/Evil Irona

Production
The Langham Huntington Hotel and Spa, in Pasadena, California, was used for exterior scenes of the sprawling Rich Family Mansion. The interior lobby and vault of the disused Valuta Bank building, in downtown Los Angeles, was used for the scene in which Richie traps the pursuing Rich security men. The background music in selected scenes was also used in Digimon, Casper: A Spirited Beginning and Casper Meets Wendy. Colonial Street at Universal City, previously used in The Munsters, Leave it to Beaver, and The 'Burbs, is also featured.

See also
 List of Christmas films

External links
 

1998 direct-to-video films
1998 films
American Christmas films
Direct-to-video action films
Films based on Harvey Comics
Warner Bros. direct-to-video films
Saban Entertainment films
Films based on American comics
Museums in popular culture
Films directed by John Murlowski
Direct-to-video sequel films
Live-action films based on comics
Films about children
Richie Rich (comics)
1990s Christmas films
Films about wish fulfillment
American sequel films
Richie Rich (film series)
1990s English-language films